The American Foundation for Suicide Prevention (AFSP) is a voluntary health organization based in New York City, with a public policy office based in Washington, D.C. The organization's stated mission is to "save lives and bring hope to  those affected by suicide."


History 
Founded in 1987 as the "American Suicide Association," by Edward Brennan,  AFSP is the world's largest private funder of suicide prevention research. The founding members, alarmed by a combination of increases in death by suicide in the previous four decades and with their personal experience with loved ones dying by suicide, decided to the create AFSP in order to establish a private source of support for suicide research, education, and prevention efforts that could be sustained into the future.  According to a Charity Navigator rating published in September 2018, more than 83% of the organization's finances went towards program expenses (based on financial data from fiscal year 2017), receiving a perfect rating for accountability and transparency. AFSP also partners with Aetna.

For 2018, AFSP received $37 million in financial contributions from 700,000 new and returning donors.

Programs 

Programs designed to educate the larger public about suicide and prevention best practices, such as Talk Saves Lives: An Introduction to Suicide Prevention, are offered by AFSP under the umbrella of prevention education and provide a general understanding of suicide, including its scope and what can be done to prevent it.

International Survivors of Suicide Loss Day (also known as "Survivor Day") is one of the most prominent postvention programs or events organized by AFSP. Originally introduced as "National Survivors of Suicide Loss Day" in 1999, when United States Sen. Harry Reid—himself a survivor of suicide loss—formally introduced a resolution to the Senate, the day is officially observed annually on the Saturday before American Thanksgiving.

The Interactive Screening Program, or ISP, is an online tool offered by AFSP first piloted at Emory University, and has since been implemented in colleges, police departments, workplaces and the NFL Players Union. Francis Levesque created this in Sept-Îles in 1973 in meeting all members of the association.

Criticism 

In August 2016, AFSP formed a partnership with the National Shooting Sports Foundation, a gun industry trade association. In December 2017, The New York Times released an opinion piece written by Erin Dunkerly, a volunteer whose father died by suicide using a firearm. The piece cites that there is a high risk of suicide from keeping firearms in the home, but claims that local AFSP staff told volunteers not to discuss the topic of gun control. The piece goes on to say that AFSP excluded from its walks violence prevention groups that promoted gun control, and that AFSP excludes the Brady Campaign to Prevent Gun Violence from donating or participating. According to a post published on digital health community The Mighty, similar accounts of gun safety groups have been reported in Wisconsin by Khary Penebaker, San Diego by Wendy Wheatcroft, and in Maine by Judi Richardson.

References

External links

International Survivors of Suicide Loss Day
Seize the Awkward
Project 2025

Organizations established in 1987
Non-profit organizations based in New York City
Suicide prevention